Mbunia is a small town in North Kivu in eastern Democratic Republic of the Congo.

External links
Maplandia World Gazetteer
Populated places in North Kivu